Sequoia Magic Loop is an S&S - Sansei Technologies inverted Screaming Squirrel steel roller coaster located in Gardaland, Italy. The ride opened in 2005 with the name Sequoia Adventure. Riders spent a considerable time inverted, with 3 'saxophone' inversions where the cars turned 180 degrees onto a flat inverted section of track.

The ride closed in June 2017 because of mechanical issues and was scheduled to reopen in 2018. The technical problems however were very hard to solve. The ride remained closed for the 2018 season.

However, in November 2018, it was confirmed by Gardaland that the ride would reopen in 2019 with a magic theme and a new name, Sequoia Magic Loop. The ride closed again in 2021 due to unclear reasons.

In December 2022, the park filed for an application/permit to remove the ride.

Ride experience
After departing the station, the car made a 180 degree right turn and began to climb the 98.4ft lift hill. After reaching the top, it then went along a short straight piece of track before entering the first saxophone inversion. The car then came out of the inversion, went along another straight piece of track and proceeded to do the same thing again. After exiting the second inversion, it travelled along a small airtime hill before doing one more saxophone inversion. It then proceeded to do a 180 degree right turn back to the station.

References

Coasterpedia: Sequoia Magic Loop